Aldobrandino II d'Este (died 1326) was the Marquess of Ferrara from 1308 until his death.

He was the son of Obizzo II d'Este and Jacopina Fieschi, the niece of Pope Adrian V. Aldobrandino became lord of Ferrara at the death of his elder brother Azzo VIII, and renounced the rights to Modena and Reggio. He was succeeded by his sons Obizzo, Rinaldo and Niccolò.

1326 deaths
Aldobrandino 2
Aldobrandino 2
14th-century Italian nobility
Year of birth unknown